Heinz "Heiner" Kördell (8 January 1932 – 2 October 2020) was a German footballer.

Career
Kördell was the son of a coal miner in Germany's Ruhrgebiet. In 1956, he joined the Schalke team from SpVgg Röhlinghausen. As an offensive midfielder, he was in the team that won for Schalke the (to date) last German championship in 1958. For six years, he played at Schalke, before joining Schwarz-Weiß Essen in 1962. In German Oberliga West (then the highest division in German football) he scored 19 goals in 103 matches. His only match in the black-and-white dress of West Germany came on 28 December 1958, in Cairo, where the Germans faced Egypt.

In 1958, he was German champion with Schalke 04. He played one international match for West Germany. Kördell was a member of the honorary committee of Schalke.

Kördell died on 2 October 2020, aged 88.

Quote 
"To us, at the time, "culture" meant having a toilet in your own flat."

References

External links 
 
 Heiner Kördell's profile at FC Schalke 04-Website 

1932 births
2020 deaths
Association football midfielders
German footballers
Germany international footballers
FC Schalke 04 players
Schwarz-Weiß Essen players